Erastria cruentaria, the thin-lined erastria, is a species of geometrid moth in the family Geometridae. It is found in North America.

The MONA or Hodges number for Erastria cruentaria is 6705.

References

Further reading

External links

 

Caberini
Articles created by Qbugbot
Moths described in 1799